FUTO or futo can refer to:

 Federal University of Technology Owerri
 Gyula Futó
 Shibaura-futō Station
 Futo Station